Diapocynin is a dimer of apocynin.

Synthesis
Diapocynin is synthesized by the activation of apocynin with ferrous sulfate and sodium persulfate. Similar to apocynin, it is shown to have some beneficial effects against oxidative stress and reducing reactive oxygen species.

References

Vanilloids
Aromatic ketones
Catechols
Dimers (chemistry)